Nagananda (Joy of the Serpents) is a Sanskrit play attributed to emperor Harsha (ruled 606 C.E. - 648 C.E.).

Nagananda is among the most acclaimed Sanskrit dramas. Through five acts, it tells the popular story of Vidyadhar King Jimutavahana's self-sacrifice to save the Nagas. The unique characteristic of this drama is the invocation to Buddha in the Nandi verse, which is considered one of the best examples of the dramatic compositions.

Nagananda is the story of how prince Jimutavahana gives up his own body to stop a sacrifice of a Naga prince to the divine Garuda.

Characters

 Jimutavahana – The Hero and Vidhyadhara Prince
 Jimutaketu – The father of hero
 Vidushaka (Atreya) – The friend of the hero
 Mitravasu – Son of Vishvavasu and brother of the heroine
 Shankachuda – A serpent, intended to be the victim of Garuda
 Garuda – King of birds and enemy of the serpents
 Kanchukin – Superintendent of the harem

 Malayavati – The heroine and daughter of king Vishvavasu
 Devi – The mother of the hero
 Vriddha – The mother of Shankhachuda
 Gauri – The Goddess
 Chaturika – Maid of Malayavati
 Manoharika – Maid of Malayavati
 Navamalika – Maid of Malayavati

Synopsis
The first act of the play opens in the penance-grove near the temple of Gauri. Jimutavahana with his friend Atreya, the Vidushaka is in search of a suitable place of residence on the Malaya Mountains, southern part of the Western Ghats, as his old parents have expressed a desire to stay there. He would spend his youth in serving the parents, as he considers such a service far above the enjoyment of the pleasures of kingdom. He had done everything in his power to make his subjects happy and had made the kingdom secure. Moving about, both of them are struck by the grandeur of the mountain and decide to stay there. Here, they happen to hear the ravishing tunes of melodious music. They enter the temple of Gauri but hide themselves to find out who was singing. Through her conversation with her maid they learn that she is a maiden and that Gauri revealed herself to her in a dream and conferred a boon that the Emperor of Vidhyadharas, Jimutavahana will marry her. The two friends reveal themselves only to make Malayavati embarrassed. Malayavati leaves the temple with a hermit without knowing Jimutavahana's true identity. The hero and heroine fall in love with each other, though they are yet strangers to each other.

Sources
The story of Jimutavahana is found in the Kathasaritsagara of Somadeva and Brihatkathamanjari of Kshemendra both written in the 11th century A.D. The story of Nagananda follows closely the shorter narrations in  both these books. Both these books are the Sanskrit versions of the Brihatkatha of Gunadhya in Paishachi language, composed about the 1st century A.D. But neither the Kathasaritsagara nor the Brihatkathamanjari, both composed in the 11th century A.D. can be accepted as the source of Nagananda which was composed in the 7th century A.D. Sri Harsha has added his own ideas and has deviated from the main story in Brihathkatha in many places. It must be admitted that the treatment of it at Harsha's hands is quite original and that the play on the whole is a very charming and fascinating one .

Performance history
The play was produced in January 2008 at Panaji ;Goa ( India ) in Marathi by Prabhakar Sanskritic Sanstha following the conventions propagated in the Natyasastra. Nagananda play was designed by Saish Deshpande, translated & directed by Anagha Deshpande whereas the Natyadharmi Abhinaya was conceived by Dr. Sharmila Rao. The play is now also available in Marathi text.

the 2008 production of "Nagananda" was adjudged as the best experimental theatre production along with best research based production both by Maharashtra state Dept. of Art & Culture as well as Akhil Bharatiya Marathi Natya Parishad.
this product by the young theatre artistes from Goa has been documented for archival purpose by All India Radio, Panaji & also by Doordarshan; Goa.
The Video is open for referencial purpose.

See also
 List of Sanskrit plays in English translation

External links
 
 Nagananda - Translated by Palmer Boyd (http://www.yorku.ca/inpar/nagananda_boyd.pdf)

Ancient Indian literature
Sanskrit texts
7th-century plays
7th-century Indian books
Sanskrit plays